Free war is a form of guerrilla warfare that is conducted with cut-off smaller military units in enemy occupied territory. The largest difference between free war and guerrilla warfare is that free war is conducted by regular military forces, instead of paramilitary organizations or irregular military forces.

The term is most often associated with the Swedish military, primarily during the Cold War era. Though Sweden no longer has free war in their official doctrine, there are still military manuals that mention and deal with this subject.

During the Cold War, conducting free war was to some degree a part of the military training curriculum in Sweden, where the purpose was to enable every conscript soldier to conduct free war in the case of enemy occupation of Sweden.

Tactics 
In free war, battles should primarily be conducted through ambushes and raids on enemy logistics and commands in order to disrupt enemy operations, which ties down more enemy combatants behind the front line, thus making frontline operations easier.

In Swedish doctrine this is also where Jägarförband units (Swedish commando-like infantry) will be conducting warfare, though through planned operations, as opposed to free war where the operations are unplanned.

In modern Swedish military doctrine 
Though there is no mention of free war in the modern Swedish strategic or operational doctrine documents, there are books that deal with this subject, namely Arméreglemente Taktik (Army Regulation Tactics) and certain Handbok Markstrid (Handbook Ground Combat) books.

This is what Arméreglemente Taktik has to say on the subject of the Free War:

Here is what Handbok Markstrid - Grupp and Handbok Markstrid - Pluton have to say on the subject of the Free War.

See also 
 Asymmetric warfare
 Stay-behind
 Deep battle

References 

Warfare by type